Kapalika is a Malayalam Drama film directed by Preethy Panikker. The film is produced by Madhusoodanan  and starring Sona Nair, K. Madhu and Sreelatha in the lead roles. The film is scripted by Rajeev Gopalakrishnan

References

1980s Malayalam-language films